William Richard Higgins (January 15, 1945 – 1988/1989) was a United States Marine Corps colonel who was captured in Lebanon in 1988 while serving on a United Nations (UN) peacekeeping mission. He was held hostage, tortured and eventually murdered by his captors.

Biography
William Higgins was born in Danville, Kentucky, on January 15, 1945.  He graduated from Southern High School in Louisville and earned his bachelor's degree from Miami University in Oxford, Ohio. A scholarship student in the Navy ROTC, he received the Marine Corps Association Award and was commissioned in the Marine Corps in 1967. He later obtained master's degrees from Pepperdine University and Auburn University. He graduated from the Army Infantry Officers Advanced Course, the Air Force Command and Staff College, and the National War College.

As a lieutenant, he participated in combat operations during 1968 in the Republic of Vietnam as a rifle company platoon commander and executive officer with C Company, 1st Battalion, 3rd Marine Regiment, 3rd Marine Division. He also was aide-de-camp to the Assistant Commander of the 3rd Marine Division.

Returning to the States, Lt. Higgins served at Headquarters Marine Corps in 1969. In 1970, he served as the Officer-in-Charge of the Officer Selection Team in Louisville, Kentucky.

He returned to Vietnam in 1972, serving as an infantry battalion advisor to the Vietnamese Marine Division. In 1973, he served as a rifle company commander with B Company, 1st Battalion, 4th Marine Regiment, 3rd Marine Division, in Vietnam.

From 1973 to 1977, Captain Higgins served at the Staff Noncommissioned Officers Academy and Officer Candidate School at Quantico, Virginia.

Returning to the Fleet Marine Force in 1977, Capt. Higgins was assigned to the 2nd Marine Division at Camp Lejeune, North Carolina, where he again served as a rifle company commander with A Company, 1st Battalion, 2nd Marine Regiment. Upon promotion to major, he was reassigned as the Logistics Officer for Regimental Landing Team 2, 4th Marine Amphibious Brigade.

After completion of the Air Force Command and Staff College at Maxwell Air Force Base in 1980, designated a distinguished graduate, Higgins returned to Washington, D.C. where he served at Headquarters as a Plans Officer until his selection to the Office of the Secretary of Defense.

During 1981 and 1982, he served as Military Assistant to the Special Assistant to the Secretary and Deputy Secretary of Defense, then as Assistant for Interagency Matters to the Executive Secretary for the Department of Defense. After graduation from the National War College in 1985, he returned to the Pentagon as the Military Assistant to the Secretary of Defense, where he served until he was transferred to his United Nations assignment in July 1987. He was promoted to colonel on March 1, 1989, while in captivity.

Capture and murder

In 1982 the situation started to become more chaotic and violent. Just three years before the kidnapping of Higgins, another retired American lieutenant colonel working for the CIA had been kidnapped, tortured, and murdered. This situation essentially repeated itself with Higgins, and on February 17, 1988, he disappeared while serving as the Chief, Observer Group Lebanon and Senior Military Observer, United Nations Military Observer Group, United Nations Truce Supervision Organization. He was driving alone on the coastal highway between Tyre and Naqoura in southern Lebanon, returning from a meeting with a local leader of the Amal movement, when a car blocked the road in front of him and forcing him to stop, after which he was pulled from his vehicle by armed men suspected of being affiliated with Hezbollah.

As a reaction to his abduction, the United Nations Security Council adopted Resolution 618, demanding his release.

During his captivity, he was interrogated and tortured. On April 21, 1988, a public statement in Arabic, along with black-and-white pictures of a disheveled and scruffy Higgins, was sent by the terrorists to the news agency Reuters in which they proclaimed that Higgins was a war criminal and would be tried by a "tribunal of the oppressed"; the kidnappers who claimed responsibility for Higgins' capture claimed to form part of a Shia Muslim terrorist organization called "The Organization of the Oppressed on Earth", which was in reality a pro-Iranian wing of Hezbollah. Higgins was eventually charged with "spying for the criminal United States on our Lebanese and Palestinian peoples" plus having an "active participation in American conspiracies against our Muslim people".  Higgins, the statement went on to elaborate, worked in Lebanon supervising a "Pentagon team to combat Lebanese and Palestinian Islamic organizations in Palestine and Lebanon". The accusations were rejected by American governmental officials as "nonsense" after noting how he had not even been working on behalf of the United States government, but for the United Nations and on a peacekeeping mission.

After his kidnapping, rumors and unconfirmed reports about Higgins' death began to circulate. For instance, on April 18, 1988, a Lebanese radio news outlet named Voice of Lebanon and controlled by Maronite Christian (and thus, unlikely to be influenced by Muslim extremists), claimed that Higgins had died in southern Lebanon in the crossfire of an armed clash between pro-Syrian and pro-Iranian militias as both Syria and Iran fought a proxy war on Lebanon for control of said country; additionally, sources from the United Nations in the region claimed that Higgins had died under torture after he had tried to escape.

On 31 July 1989, the group announced that it had executed Higgins by hanging, and publicly released a videotape of the murder along with a statement calling the graphic footage "an opening gift" for Israel and the United States. This was in retaliation for the abduction of Hezbollah leader Sheik Abdul Karim Obeid by Israeli commandos in South Lebanon, 27 July 1989, during which two other people accompanying Obeid also were taken and a neighbour killed. The operation had been planned by Israel's then Minister of Defence, Yitzhak Rabin.

The footage showed images of his body, hanging by the neck as he slowly suffocated to death, and were televised around the world. FBI experts analyzed the footage and concluded the body hanged was indeed Colonel Higgins. The video was also examined by Israeli security services, who raised doubts about its authenticity. Among other things, Higgins is seen in the video wearing a coat and winter clothes, which does not match the summer weather in July in Lebanon. Afterwards, with the return of his body to the Americans, knife cuts were discovered in his throat - which was likely the cause of death. According to the researchers who examined all the evidence, Higgins was murdered in December 1988.

Higgins was eventually declared dead on July 6, 1990 and his remains recovered on December 23, 1991, by Major Jens Nielsen of the Royal Danish Army, who was attached to the United Nations Observation Group in Beirut. The remains were found in an advanced state of decomposition beside a mosque near a south Beirut hospital; however, the body had been buried for several months prior.  After Higgins was murdered, his kidnappers had buried the body then dug it out almost a year later with their public statements.
Once recovered, Colonel Higgins' body was flown to Dover Air Force Base in Delaware, where it was conclusively identified and then he was interred at Quantico National Cemetery, Triangle, Virginia, on December 30, 1991. 
A memorial and religious service for Higgins had previously been held in November, 1989 in Louisville's Southern High School, from where Higgins had graduated in 1963.

Aftermath
On February 16, 1992, Israeli troops assassinated Hezbollah leader Abbas al-Musawi. Hezbollah responded one month later by attacking the Israeli embassy in Buenos Aires, killing 29 people.

In 1999, Higgins' widow filed a civil suit against Iran as the main sponsor of Hezbollah and the Islamic Revolutionary Guard in United States Federal district court. The court ruled in her favor and issued a default judgement ordering the defendants, including the Islamic Republic Iran, to pay over $55 million in compensatory damages, the court further ordered an additional $300 million in punitive damages be paid by the Revolutionary Guard. Any compensatory amounts recovered were shared among family members, attorneys' fees, and a non-profit organization. The punitive amounts are considered to be unrecoverable.

Military awards
Higgins' military decorations and awards include the following:

In April 2003, he was posthumously granted a Prisoner of War Medal. Department of Defense General Counsel, Judith A. Miller, initially blocked the award in 1998 based on the claim that "circumstances do not appear to meet the criteria established by Congress for award of the Prisoner of War Medal."  The Navy later overruled her after it was determined that the 1989 expansion of the eligibility criteria allowed the award.

Other awards and honors
On March 18, 1992, President George Bush awarded Colonel Higgins the Presidential Citizens Medal (posthumous).  The medal was accepted by his wife, Robin, and daughter, Chrissy. Higgins also was survived by two sisters.

On February 17, 1994, the Secretary of the Navy announced a new Arleigh Burke-class guided missile destroyer would be named for Higgins.

See also
 William Francis Buckley: Another retired lieutenant colonel from the United States Army working as a CIA officer in Lebanon who was kidnapped, tortured and murdered by Islamic terrorists in 1985.
 List of kidnappings
 List of solved missing person cases

References

Further reading
 
 
 

1945 births
1990 deaths
People from Danville, Kentucky
Military personnel from Louisville, Kentucky
Miami University alumni
United States Marine Corps colonels
United States Marine Corps personnel of the Vietnam War
American people taken hostage
Kidnappings by Islamists
American terrorism victims
American torture victims
Assassinated American people
Deaths by hanging
Recipients of the Defense Distinguished Service Medal
Recipients of the Legion of Merit
American prisoners of war
Recipients of the Gallantry Cross (Vietnam)
American people murdered abroad
People murdered in Lebanon
Burials at Quantico National Cemetery
Presidential Citizens Medal recipients
Recipients of the Defense Superior Service Medal
American military personnel killed in action
Southern High School (Kentucky) alumni
National War College alumni